Albert Aereboe (31 January 1889 – 6 August 1970) was a German painter of the modernity.

Life 
Born in Lübeck as the son of the pastor at Lübeck Cathedral, Aereboe first attended the Katharineum and the Johanneum, and then in 1906 underwent his training as a craftsman and artist in Berlin.

In 1910, he returned to Lübeck and attended the art school of Leo von Lütgendorff there. On Lütgendorff's recommendation, he went to Munich in 1912 to the Akademie der bildenden Künste and studied with Hugo von Habermann until 1915. In 1916, he was called up for military service. Only photographs of this work have survived. After the war, Aereboe worked as a freelance artist, first in Lübeck, and from 1925 on Sylt. In the meantime, from 1919 to 1926, he led the class for decorative painting at the Staatliche Kunstgewerbeschule in Kassel, where he was awarded the title of professor in 1923. Here he met the painter Julie Katz (1888–1927), who had led the class for textiles since 1919 and became a professor in 1923; they both married in 1922.

One of his outstanding works is My Ancestor Jens Aereboe. Among other things, discussed on the occasion of its exhibition at the Behnhaus under A Monumental Painting by Albert Aereboe in the  13 November 1927. The artist had here painted his ancestor lord, who was a faustian. Like Dürer's Jerome, the latter sits in a housing, albeit a completely Nordic one. Through the window one sees an austere dunescape and raindrops run along the glass. Inside are relationships to mathematics and optics. In the centre is the mentally worked-through face of the ancestor. The suspended glass sphere that intersects the face of "Jens Aereboe" is a symbol that makes itself understood without words. Through the door in the background, wrapped only in a flowing veil, comes a naked female figure. She too is of heightened significance.

In the 1930s he also ran a studio in Berlin, but returned to bombed out Sylt in 1943 and worked exclusively in Lübeck again from 1959. He died in Lübeck. Here he was buried in 1970 in accordance with his last will in the Wenningstedter cemetery.

Exhibitions (selection)

Solo exhibitions 
 Albert Aereboe, St. Anne's Museum Quarter, Lübeck, 1970.
 Albert Aereboe, Kunsthalle Kiel, 1983.
 Im Bann der Insel. Albert Aereboe, Sylter Heimatmuseum, Keitum 2018/2019, (Katalog).

Participations 
 1929: Große Kunstausstellung, Kunstverein Kassel
 Lübecker Grafik der zwanziger Jahre, with Erich Dummer, Asmus Jessen, Alfred Mahlau, Hans Peters, Waldemar Rosatis, Leopold Thieme, Museum im St.-Annen-Kloster, Lübeck, 1978/1979 and  1979.

 Neuerwerbungen und Bilder aus dem Bestand des Söl'ring Foriining, with Andreas Dirks, Otto Eglau, Carl Christian Feddersen, C. P. Hansen, Richard Kaiser, Hugo Köcke, Franz Korwan, Ingo Kühl, Walther Kunau, Dieter Röttger, Siegward Sprotte, Helene Varges, Magnus Weidemann among others, Sylter Heimatmuseum, Keitum / Sylt 2003.

Awards and honours 
 1959: Honorary citizen of Kampen on Sylt
 1968:  (together with Gertrud-Wiebke Schröder)

Museum presence 
 Behnhaus Lübeck – Die rote Jacke (1924), Selbstbildnis in der Turmstube des Doms (1924), Das tote Lamm
 Kunsthalle Kiel
 Landesmuseum Schloss Gottorf

References

Further reading 
 Abram B. Enns: Kunst und Bürgertum. Lübeck 1978, pp. 188 ff. 
 Brigitte Maaß-Spielmann: Der Maler Albert Aereboe, 1889–1970. Schriften der Kunsthalle Kiel, vol. 9 1983. (zgl. Phil.Diss. der Christian-Albrechts-Universität Kiel 1981). 
 Manfred Wedemeyer: "Die Meernatur der Insel hat mich gebannt": Der Maler Albert Aereboe in List und Kampen auf Sylt. In Die Heimat 1981, 
 Manfred Wedemeyer: Albert Aereboe: Der Arnikaweg müßte Aereboestraße heißen. In Käuze, Künstler, Kenner – kaum gekanntes Sylt, Verlag Pomp & Sobkowiak, Essen 1986. 
 Ulrich Schulte-Wülwer: Albert Aereboe. In Sylt in der Malerei, Westholsteinische Verlagsanstalt Boyens & Co., Heide 1996. 
 Ulrich Schulte-Wülwer: Albert Aereboe. In Künstlerinsel Sylt, Boyens Buchverlag, Heide 2005.  (previous: 3-8042-1171-2)
 Aereboe, Albert. In Das neue Sylt Lexikon, published by Harry Kunz and Thomas Steensen, Wachholtz Verlag, Neumünster 2007. 
 Aereboe, Albert. In Taschenlexikon Sylt, published by Harry Kunz and Thomas Steensen, Wachholtz Verlag, Neumünster/Hamburg 2014. 
 Alexander Römer (ed.): Im Bann der Insel. Albert Aereboe. Katalog zur Sonderausstellung im Sylter Heimatmuseum 2018–2019. Söl'ring Foriining, Keitum 2018.

 

20th-century German painters
20th-century German male artists
Modern painters
1889 births
1970 deaths
People from Lübeck